Upland Baptist Church is a Baptist church built in 1851 in Upland Borough, Delaware County, Pennsylvania, United States.

History
John Price Crozer, a textile manufacturer and philanthropist from Upland, funded the construction of the church in 1851.  Construction was completed and the church was dedicated in 1852.

William Bucknell, businessman and benefactor to Bucknell University, was a generous donor to the church.

Further improvements to the church were made in 1886 with the addition of a chapel, classrooms and a large recreation room.

Upland Baptist church established chapels at Leiperville and Bridgewater and was involved in organizing the Village Green and South Chester churches.

On February 1, 1955, a fire caused severe damage to the chapel.

Notable burials
 John Price Crozer (1793–1866) – textile manufacturer, banker and philanthropist – benefactor of the church

References

External links
 

Cemeteries in Delaware County, Pennsylvania
Religious organizations established in 1851
Churches in Delaware County, Pennsylvania
1851 establishments in Pennsylvania
Baptist churches in Pennsylvania
Churches completed in 1851